This is a list of Monuments of National Importance as officially recognized by and available through the website of the Archaeological Survey of India (ASI) in the Indian state Andhra Pradesh. The monument identifier is a combination of the abbreviation of the subdivision of the list (state, ASI circle) and the numbering as published on the website of the ASI.  Eight sites formerly listed in Andhra Pradesh, are now in Telangana, former numbers N-AP-78 to N-AP-80, N-AP-105, N-AP-106, and N-AP-129 to N-AP-131, leaving 129 Monuments of National Importance.

List of monuments of national importance 

|}

See also 
 List of Monuments of National Importance in India for other Monuments of National Importance in India
 List of State Protected Monuments in Andhra Pradesh
 List of Monuments of National Importance in Telangana (a state formed in 2014)

Notes and references 

Andhra Pradesh
Lists of tourist attractions in Andhra Pradesh